Andrew John Susac (born March 22, 1990) is an American professional baseball catcher who is a free agent. He has played in Major League Baseball (MLB) for the San Francisco Giants, Milwaukee Brewers, Baltimore Orioles, Kansas City Royals and Pittsburgh Pirates. Susac played college baseball at Oregon State University.

Career

Amateur
Susac attended Jesuit High School in Carmichael, California, where he played for the school's baseball team as a catcher. He signed a letter of intent with Oregon State University to play college baseball for the Oregon State Beavers baseball team, but was also coveted by Major League Baseball (MLB) organizations. Baseball America rated Susac as the 40th-best available player in the upcoming 2009 MLB Draft. After Susac graduated from Jesuit, the Philadelphia Phillies selected Susac in the 16th round of the draft. Susac opted not to sign, instead enrolling at Oregon State. In 2010, he played collegiate summer baseball with the Falmouth Commodores of the Cape Cod Baseball League and was named a league all-star.

San Francisco Giants
Eligible for the 2011 MLB Draft, the San Francisco Giants selected Susac in the second round. Susac signed with the Giants, receiving a $1.1 million signing bonus. The Giants assigned Susac to the San Jose Giants of the Class A-Advanced California League in 2012 and the Richmond Flying Squirrels of the Class AA Eastern League in 2013. He hit .256 in Richmond with 12 home runs and 46 RBIs, earning an Eastern League All-Star selection, and was invited to the Arizona Fall League, where he adjusted his swing and improved to hit .360 with two home runs and 11 walks in 17 games.  Susac was listed as MLB.com's #3 prospect in the Giants organization for 2014.  Susac began the 2014 season with the Fresno Grizzlies of the Class AAA Pacific Coast League (PCL), where he batted .268 in 63 games through July 26.

The Giants called Susac up to the major league club late on July 25, 2014, to replace backup catcher Héctor Sánchez after Sánchez showed concussion symptoms. Susac flew to San Francisco the next morning and played his first MLB game that evening vs. the Los Angeles Dodgers, grounding out to third base in a single at-bat against Clayton Kershaw who shut out the Giants that day. Susac got his first major league hit, a single, on July 30, 2014, and his first major-league home run (a two-run homer) at Wrigley Field against Chicago Cubs pitcher Edwin Jackson on August 20, 2014.

However, Susac later played in the September 1 continuation of the Giants vs. Colorado Rockies game from May 22 (over three months earlier), which was suspended by rain, and due to MLB's record-keeping rules, May 22 is the date given for his official MLB debut. Susac also singled to left field and was later driven home by a double from Hunter Pence. Because the game was a continuation, May 22 is also the official date for Susac's first hit and first run scored, and with a swinging strikeout later in the same game his batting average was briefly .500.  Susac finished the regular season with three home runs and 19 RBIs, batting .273 in 35 games played.

Susac was the Giants' backup catcher behind Buster Posey during the 2014 postseason.  He appeared in four games, batting 1-for-4 (.250) as the Giants won the 2014 World Series.

In 2015, Susac was the only Giants prospect in Baseball America's top 100 list.  However, he was set back in Spring Training with a tooth infection and wrist injury and subsequently started the season with the Sacramento River Cats of the PCL.  Susac was called up to the Giants on April 18 when Jake Peavy went on the disabled list.  On June 27, Susac hit a bases-loaded double that drove in three runs and helped the Giants come from behind to defeat the Colorado Rockies 7–5. In late June, Susac was named the Giants' regular catcher as the team dealt with outfield injuries that pushed Buster Posey to first base and Brandon Belt to left field.

On July 18, Susac sprained his right thumb while sliding into third base and was placed on the 15-day disabled list.  Susac was activated on August 17, but was shut down for the season on September 5 due to lingering effects from the wrist sprain suffered in Spring Training.  He underwent surgery on his wrist to remove bone fragments and address inflammation.  In 2015, Susac appeared in 52 games, batting .218/.297/.368 with 3 home runs and 14 RBIs.

During spring training, Susac was set back by his sore right wrist and was optioned to Triple-A Sacramento to start the season.

Milwaukee Brewers
Susac had 36 RBIs in 58 games for Sacramento before being traded along with the Giants top minor league prospect and 2015 First Round draft pick pitcher Phil Bickford to the Milwaukee Brewers for relief pitcher Will Smith on August 1, 2016.

Baltimore Orioles
Susac was traded to the Baltimore Orioles on February 2, 2018 for a player to be named later. He was designated for assignment on January 11, 2019 after the Orioles claimed Hanser Alberto off waivers from the New York Yankees. He was outrighted on January 18, 2019.

Kansas City Royals
On April 2, 2019, Susac was traded to the Kansas City Royals in exchange for cash considerations. He became a free agent following the 2019 season.

Pittsburgh Pirates
On January 31, 2020, Susac signed a minor league deal with the Pittsburgh Pirates. On September 27, 2020, Susac was selected to the 40-man and active rosters. Susac was outrighted off of the 40-man roster three days later on September 30. He re-signed to a minor league deal on November 2, 2020. He elected free agency on November 7, 2021.

Personal life
Susac's younger brother, Daniel, played baseball at the University of Arizona and was drafted by the Oakland Athletics in the 2022 MLB draft.

References

External links

 

1990 births
Living people
People from Roseville, California
People from Carmichael, California
Baseball players from California
Major League Baseball catchers
San Francisco Giants players
Milwaukee Brewers players
Baltimore Orioles players
Pittsburgh Pirates players
Oregon State Beavers baseball players
Falmouth Commodores players
San Jose Giants players
Richmond Flying Squirrels players
Fresno Grizzlies players
Scottsdale Scorpions players
Sacramento River Cats players
Colorado Springs Sky Sox players
Wisconsin Timber Rattlers players
Norfolk Tides players
Omaha Storm Chasers players
Indianapolis Indians players